Yelena Vladimirovna Sokolova (born 27 December 1979) is a Russian long-distance runner.

She ran at the 2010 Frankfurt Marathon and set a personal best time of 2:28:01 for eighth place.

International competitions

References 

1979 births
Living people
Russian female long-distance runners
Russian female marathon runners
Russian Athletics Championships winners